In mathematics, the Noether normalization lemma is a result of commutative algebra, introduced by Emmy Noether in 1926. It states that for any field k, and any finitely generated commutative k-algebra A, there exists a non-negative integer d and algebraically independent elements y1, y2, ..., yd in A such that A is a finitely generated module over the polynomial ring S = k[y1, y2, ..., yd].

The integer d above is uniquely determined; it is the Krull dimension of the ring A. When A is an integral domain, d is also the transcendence degree of the field of fractions of A over k.

The theorem has a geometric interpretation. Suppose A is integral. Let S be the coordinate ring of the d-dimensional affine space , and let A be the coordinate ring of some other d-dimensional affine variety X.  Then the inclusion map S → A induces a surjective finite morphism of affine varieties . The conclusion is that any affine variety is a branched covering of affine space.
When k is infinite, such a branched covering map can be constructed by taking a general projection from an affine space containing X to a d-dimensional subspace.

More generally, in the language of schemes, the theorem can equivalently be stated as follows: every affine k-scheme (of finite type) X is finite over an affine n-dimensional space. The theorem can be refined to include a chain of ideals of R (equivalently, closed subsets of X) that are finite over the affine coordinate subspaces of the appropriate dimensions.

The form of the Noether normalization lemma stated above can be used as an important step in proving Hilbert's Nullstellensatz.  This gives it further geometric importance, at least formally, as the Nullstellensatz underlies the development of much of classical algebraic geometry. The theorem is also an important tool in establishing the notions of Krull dimension for k-algebras.

Proof 
The following proof is due to Nagata and is taken from Mumford's red book. A proof in the geometric flavor is also given in the page 127 of the red book and this mathoverflow thread.

The ring A in the lemma is generated as a k-algebra by elements, say, . We shall induct on m. If , then the assertion is trivial. Assume now .

Since otherwise there would be nothing to prove, we can also assume that there is a nonzero polynomial f in m variables over k such that
.
Given an integer r which is determined later, set

Then the preceding reads:
.
Now, if  is a monomial appearing in the left-hand side of the above equation, with coefficient , the highest term in  after expanding the product looks like

However, if r is larger than any exponent appearing in f, then each  encodes a unique base r number, so this does not occur. Since  are also integral over that ring, A is integral over S. It follows A is finite over S, and since S is generated by m-1 elements, by the inductive hypothesis we are done.

If A is an integral domain, then d is the transcendence degree of its field of fractions. Indeed, A and  have the same transcendence degree (i.e., the degree of the field of fractions) since the field of fractions of A is algebraic over that of S (as A is integral over S) and S has transcendence degree d. Thus, it remains to show the Krull dimension of the polynomial ring S is d. (This is also a consequence of dimension theory.) We induct on d, with the case  being trivial. Since  is a chain of prime ideals, the dimension is at least d. To get the reverse estimate, let  be a chain of prime ideals. Let . We apply the noether normalization and get  (in the normalization process, we're free to choose the first variable) such that S is integral over T. By the inductive hypothesis,  has dimension d - 1. Since , we have . Hence, .

Refinement 
The following refinement appears in Eisenbud's book, which builds on Nagata's idea:

Geometrically speaking, the last part of the theorem says that for  any general linear projection  induces a finite morphism  (cf. the lede); besides Eisenbud, see also .

Illustrative application: generic freeness 
The proof of generic freeness (the statement later) illustrates a typical yet nontrivial application of the normalization lemma. Then there is some  such that  is a free -module.

This is to say there is some  such that  and so  is free as an -module. For the inductive step, note  is a finitely generated -algebra. Hence, by the Noether normalization lemma,  contains algebraically independent elements  such that  is finite over the polynomial ring . We now consider:

But that will be the case after inverting a single element, as follows.
To finish, consider a finite filtration  by -submodules such that  for prime ideals  (such a filtration exists by the theory of associated primes).

Notes

References

. NB the lemma is in the updating comments.

Further reading 
Robertz, D.: Noether normalization guided by monomial cone decompositions. J. Symbolic Comput. 44(10), 1359–1373 (2009)

Commutative algebra
Algebraic varieties
Lemmas in algebra
Algebraic geometry